Lida Gustava Heymann (15 March 1868 – 31 July 1943) was a German feminist, pacifist and women's rights activist.

Together with her partner Anita Augspurg she was one of the most prominent figures in the bourgeois women's movement.  She was, among other things, in the forefront of the Verband Fortschrittlicher Frauenvereine ("Association of Women's Groups").

She co-founded the abolitionist movement in Germany. In this role she came into conflict with the law as she protested about the treatment of prostitutes and called for the abolition of state regulation for them.  Heymann wanted to "help women free themselves from male domination."  With her vast inheritance she established a women's centre, offering meals, a crèche and counselling.  She also founded a co-educational high school and professional associations for female clerks and theatre workers.

In 1902 she jointly founded (with Anita Augspurg) the first German Verein für Frauenstimmrecht ("Society for Women's Suffrage").  Together with Augspurg, she published the newspaper Frau im Staat ("Women in the State") from 1919 to 1933.  This newspaper presented the pacifist, feminist and democratic positions on various subjects.

In 1923 Heymann and Augspurg called for the Austrian Adolf Hitler to be expelled from Germany.  When Hitler seized power in 1933, both were out of the country; they did not return.  Their property was confiscated and they settled in Switzerland.  Heymann died in 1943 and was buried in Fluntern Cemetery.

Notes

Sources
 This article was abridged, adapted and translated from its counterpart on the German Wikipedia on 24 February 2011.

 Women, Peace and Transnational Activism, History and Policy (2015)

1868 births
1943 deaths
German feminists
German pacifists
Pacifist feminists
German suffragists
German women's rights activists
German LGBT people
People from Hamburg
Lesbian feminists
Burials at Fluntern Cemetery
Women's International League for Peace and Freedom people